Mere Bewafa is a 2018 Pakistani drama serial that originally aired on A-Plus Entertainment from 7 March 2018, 2015. It is directed by actress and director Sakina Samo and written by Zanjabeel Asim Shah and stars Agha Ali, Sarah Khan and Zhalay Sarhadi in pivot roles.

Cast
Agha Ali as Shahmeer (Main male lead)
Sarah Khan as Azra (Main female lead)
Zhalay Sarhadi as Mona (Antagonist)
Shagufta Ejaz as Safia
Madiha Rizvi as Muskan
Pari Hashmi as Hina
Sabiha Hashmi as Nighat
Osama Tahir as Khizar
Hassan Noman as shahnawaz
Sadaf Aashan as Abdah

Production 
Serial is directed by actress and director Sakina Samo, and produced by Sadia Jabbar Productions. The drama features Sarah Khan and Agha Ali in lead. Zhalay Sarhadi Pari hashmi khan playing the role of the antagonist.

Soundtrack

The title song was composed by Agha Ali and has more than 2 million views on YouTube.

Track listing

References

External links
 

Pakistani drama television series
2018 Pakistani television series debuts
2018 Pakistani television series endings
Urdu-language television shows
A-Plus TV original programming